Peter Power is a British crisis management specialist and has advised many organisations in his area of speciality.

Personal history
Peter Power was born in the UK in 1951. He served in the 10 Battalion Parachute Regiment Territorial Army 1969–1971 before joining the Metropolitan Police in 1971. His service in that force included the Special Patrol Group and attachments to the Metropolitan Police Anti-Terrorist Branch and other front line units.  In 1990 he transferred on promotion to Dorset. He retired from Dorset in 1993.
In 1995 Power set up his own company in central London, Visor Consultants.

7 July 2005
Power spoke on ITV and BBC TV news regarding a crisis management simulation exercise his company allegedly ran on this day, working in the premises of a private company in the City of London, using a scenario very similar to the 7 July 2005 London bombings. Power told the BBC that the exercise scenario included bombs going off at exactly the same stations as they actually did in the actual attacks. Power said that this coinciding of his exercise and the real attacks was a coincidence and was based on the previous terrorist incidents in London, including 18 bombs already detonated on the London Underground since 1885 (see Attacks on the London Underground). An investigation by the BBC series The Conspiracy Files identified the client Power's company worked for that day delivering a simulation exercise. It examined allegations about his company and others, involved in an alleged UK government "cover-up" similar to 9/11 conspiracy theories. Power has always denied this and the programme found no evidence to support such allegations.

References

External links
 Visor Consultants: The Visor Team
 BBC - Organising forward command. Kings Cross 18 November 1987
 BBC - Preparing for a crisis
 Risk and Continuity: Convergence is in the Air...
 BBC - Discussing the impact of terrorism on London
 BBC - Brixton Riots

1951 births
Living people
Metropolitan Police officers
Emergency management in the United Kingdom